Portuguese animation (Portuguese: Animação portuguesa) is animation created in Portugal or by Portuguese animators.

History
In 2013, Kali, o pequeno vampiro won the award for Best Animated Short Film at the 2013 Sophia Awards.
In 2014, O gigante was nominated for Best Animated Short Film at the 28th Goya Awards.

Animators
 João Fazenda
 Abi Feijó
 Isabel Aboim Inglez
 Regina Pessoa
 Cláudio Sá

Awards
 Sophia Award for Best Animated Short Film

Festivals
 Cinanima
 Monstra

Works
Midsummer Dream
Até ao tecto do mundo
Do céu e da terra
Tragic Story with Happy Ending
Kali, o pequeno vampiro
Lágrimas de um palhaço
Sem querer
Nutri Ventures – The Quest for the 7 Kingdoms
O gigante

See also

Portuguese comics

References